These are the official results of the Women's Shot Put event at the 1999 World Championships in Seville, Spain. There were a total number of 26 participating athletes, with the final held on Wednesday 25 August 1999.

Medalists

Schedule
All times are Central European Time (UTC+1)

Abbreviations
All results shown are in metres

Startlist

Records

Qualification

Group A

Group B

Final

References
 IAAF
 trackandfieldnews
 todor66

D
Shot put at the World Athletics Championships
1999 in women's athletics